Huracanes de Mayabeque (English: Mayabeque Hurricanes) is a Cuban baseball team based in San José de las Lajas. They are a member of the Cuban National Series and play their home games at Nelson Fernández Stadium, opened in 1960 and with a capacity of 3,000 spectators.

History
In 2011, Cuban government decided to split Havana Province into two newly created administrative divisions:  Mayabeque Province and Artemisa Province. This led to the disappearance of the La Habana team and to the creation of the Mayabeque and Cazadores de Artemisa teams, who started playing in the 2011–12 Cuban National Series season.

Roster

References

Baseball teams in Cuba
Baseball teams established in 2011
2011 establishments in Cuba